Sogndal Folk High School was a folk high school in Sogndal municipality, Norway.

One of the first of its kind in Norway, it was founded by Jakob Sverdrup, inspired by Grundtvigianism during his studies, in 1871. Sverdrup was initially headmaster, but following illness he first left the post to his brother Hersleb Sverdrup, then to Henrik Mohn Dahl.

References 

Folk high schools in Norway
Education in Vestland
Educational institutions established in 1871
1871 establishments in Norway
Sogndal